Hoskote Lok Sabha constituency was a former Lok Sabha constituency in Mysore State (Karnataka from 1967 to 1977).  This seat came into existence in 1967 and ceased to exist in 1976, before 1977 Lok Sabha Elections. This constituency was later merged with Chikballapur Lok Sabha constituency.

Members of Parliament 

1952-62: Constituency does not exist. See Kolar Lok Sabha constituency
1962-67: Constituency does not exist. See Chikballapur Lok Sabha constituency
1967: M. V. Krishnappa, Indian National Congress
1971: M. V. Krishnappa, Indian National Congress
1977 Onwards: Constituency does not exist. See Chikballapur Lok Sabha constituency

See also
 Chikballapur Lok Sabha constituency
 Kolar Lok Sabha constituency
 Bangalore Rural district
 List of former constituencies of the Lok Sabha

References

Bangalore Rural district
1977 disestablishments in India
Lok Sabha constituencies in Mysore
Former constituencies of the Lok Sabha
Constituencies disestablished in 1977
Former Lok Sabha constituencies of Karnataka